Lewis Henry Morgan  (November 21, 1818 – December 17, 1881) was a pioneering American anthropologist and social theorist who worked as a railroad lawyer. He is best known for his work on kinship and social structure, his theories of social evolution, and his ethnography of the Iroquois. Interested in what holds societies together, he proposed the concept that the earliest human domestic institution was the matrilineal clan, not the patriarchal family.

Also interested in what leads to social change, he was a contemporary of the European social theorists Karl Marx and Friedrich Engels, who were influenced by reading his work on social structure and material culture, the influence of technology on progress. Morgan is the only American social theorist to be cited by such diverse scholars as Marx, Charles Darwin, and Sigmund Freud. Elected as a member of the National Academy of Sciences, Morgan served as president of the American Association for the Advancement of Science in 1880.

Morgan was a Republican member of the New York State Assembly (Monroe Co., 2nd D.) in 1861, and of the New York State Senate in 1868 and 1869.

Biography

The American Morgans
According to Herbert Marshall Lloyd, an attorney and editor of Morgan's works, Lewis was descended from James Morgan, a Welsh pioneer. Various sources record that James and his brothers, Miles and John, the three sons of William Morgan of Llandaff, Glamorganshire, left Wales for Boston in 1636. From there John Morgan went to Virginia, Miles to Springfield, Massachusetts, and James to New London, Connecticut. Lloyd writes, "From these two brothers [James and Miles] all the Morgans prominent in the annals of New York and New England are believed to be descended." It is these Morgans who played a critical part in the foundation of the colonies. During the American Revolutionary War, they were Continentals. Immediately after the war, James’s line, along with many other land-hungry Yankees, migrated into New York State. Following the United States' victory against the British, the new government forced the latter's Iroquois allies to cede most of their traditional lands in New York and Pennsylvania to the US. New York made 5 million acres available for public sale. In addition, the US government granted some plots in western New York to Revolutionary War veterans as compensation for their military service. L. H. Morgan's ancestor James Morgan's brother Miles Morgan was the ancestor of J. P. Morgan.

Early life and education
Lewis' grandfather, Thomas Morgan of Connecticut, had been a Continental soldier in the Revolutionary War. Afterward he and his family migrated west to New York's Finger Lakes region, where he bought land from the Cayuga people and planted a farm on the shores of Lake Cayuga near Aurora. He and his wife already had three sons, including Jedediah, the future father of Lewis; and a daughter.

In 1797, Jedediah Morgan (1774–1826) married Amanda Stanton, settling on a 100-acre gift of land from his father. After she had five children and died, Jedediah married Harriet Steele of Hartford, Connecticut. They had eight more children, including Lewis. As an adult, he adopted the middle initial "H." Morgan later decided that this H, if anything, stood for "Henry".

A multi-skilled Yankee, Jedediah Morgan invented a plow and formed a business partnership to manufacture parts for it; he built a blast furnace for the factory. He moved to Aurora, leaving the farm to a son. After joining the Masons, he helped to form the first Masonic lodge in Aurora. Elected a state senator, Morgan supported the construction of the Erie Canal, which opened in 1825.

At his death in 1826, Jedediah left 500 acres with herds and flocks in trust for the support of his family. This provided for education as well. Morgan studied classical subjects at Cayuga Academy: Latin, Greek, rhetoric and mathematics. His father had bequeathed money specifically for his college education, after giving land to the other children for their occupations. Morgan chose Union College in Schenectady. Due to his work at Cayuga Academy, Morgan finished college in two years, 1838–1840, graduating at age 22. The curriculum continued study of classics combined with science, especially mechanics and optics. Morgan was strongly interested in the works of the French naturalist Georges Cuvier.

Eliphalet Nott, the president of Union College, was an inventor of stoves and a boiler; he held 31 patents. A Presbyterian minister, he kept the young men under a tight discipline, forbidding alcoholic beverages and requiring students to get permission to go to town. He held up the Bible as the one practical standard for all behavior. His career ended with some notoriety when he was investigated by the state for attempting to raise funds for the college through a lottery. The students evaded his strict regime by founding secret (and forbidden) fraternities, such as the Kappa Alpha Society. Lewis Morgan joined in 1839.

The New Confederacy of the Iroquois

After graduating in 1840, Morgan returned to Aurora to read the law with an established firm. In 1842 he was admitted to the bar in Rochester, where he went into partnership with a Union classmate, George F. Danforth, a future judge. They could find no clients, as the nation was in an economic depression, which had started with the Panic of 1837. Morgan wrote essays, which he had begun to do while studying law, and published some in The Knickerbocker under the pen name Aquarius.

On January 1, 1841, Morgan and some friends from Cayuga Academy formed a secret fraternal society which they called the Gordian Knot. As Morgan's earliest essays from that time had classical themes, the club may have been a kind of literary society, as was common then. In 1841 or 1842 the young men redefined the society, renaming it the Order of the Iroquois. Morgan referred to this event as cutting the knot. In 1843 they named it the Grand Order of the Iroquois, followed by the New Confederacy of the Iroquois. They made the group a research organization to collect information on the Iroquois, whose historical territory for centuries had included central and upstate New York west of the Hudson and the Finger Lakes region.

The men intended to resurrect the spirit of the Iroquois. They tried to learn the languages, assumed Iroquois names, and organized the group by the historic pattern of Iroquois tribes. In 1844 they received permission from the former Freemasons of Aurora to use the upper floor of the Masonic temple as a meeting hall. New members underwent a secret rite called inindianation in which they were transformed spiritually into Iroquois. They met in the summer around campfires and paraded yearly through the town in costume. Morgan seemed infused with the spirit of the Iroquois. He said, "We are now upon the very soil over which they exercised dominion ... Poetry still lingers around the scenery. ... " These new Iroquois retained a literary frame of mind, but they intended to focus on "the writing of a native American epic that would define national identity".

Encounter with the Iroquois

On an 1844 business trip to New York’s capital, Albany, Morgan started research on old Cayuga treaties in the state archives. The Seneca people were also studying old US-Native American treaties to support their land claims.

After the Revolutionary War, the United States had forced the four Iroquois tribes allied with the British to cede their lands and migrate to Canada. By specific treaties, the US set aside small reservations in New York for their own allies, the Onondaga and Seneca. In the 1840s, long after the war, the Ogden Land Company, a real estate venture, laid claim to the Seneca Tonawanda Reservation on the basis of a fraudulent treaty. The Seneca sued and had representatives at the state capital pressing their case when Morgan was there.

The delegation, led by Jimmy Johnson, its chief officer (and son of chief Red Jacket), were essentially former officers of what was left of the Iroquois Confederacy. Johnson's 16-year-old grandson Ha-sa-ne-an-da (Ely Parker) accompanied them as their interpreter, as he had attended a mission school and was bilingual. By chance Morgan and the young Parker encountered each other in an Albany book store. Soon intrigued by Morgan's talk of the New Confederacy, Parker invited the older man to interview Johnson and meet the delegation. Morgan took pages of organizational notes, which he used to remodel the New Confederacy. Beyond such details of scholarship, Morgan and the Seneca men formed deep attachments of friendship.

Morgan and his colleagues invited Parker to join the New Confederacy. They (chiefly Morgan) paid for the rest of Parker's education at the Cayuga Academy, along with his sister and a friend of hers. Later the Confederacy paid for Parker's studies at Rensselaer Polytechnic Institute in Troy, New York, where he graduated in civil engineering. After military service in the American Civil War, from which Parker retired at the rank of brigadier general, he entered the upper ranks of civil service in the presidency of his former commander, Ulysses S. Grant.

The Ogden Land Company affair
Meanwhile, the organization had had activist goals from the beginning. In his initial New Gordius address Morgan had said:

... when the last tribe shall slumber in the grass, it is to be feared that the stain of blood will be found on the escutcheon of the American republic. This nation must shield their declining day ...

In 1838 the Ogden Land Company began a campaign to defraud the remaining Iroquois in New York of their lands. By Iroquois law, only a unanimous vote of all the chiefs sitting in council could effect binding decisions relating to the tribe. The OLC set about to purchase the votes of as many chiefs as it could, plying some with alcohol. The chiefs in many cases complied, believing any resolutions to sell the land would be defeated in council. Obtaining a majority vote for sale at one council called for the purpose, the OLC took their treaty to the Congress of the United States, which knew nothing of Iroquois law. President Martin Van Buren advised Congress that the treaty was fraudulent but on June 11, 1838, Congress adopted it as a resolution. After being compensated for their land by $1.67 per acre (Morgan said it was worth $16 per acre), the Seneca were to be evicted forthwith.

The great majority of the tribe were against the sale of the land. When they discovered they had been defrauded, they were galvanized to action. The New Confederacy stepped into the case on the side of the Seneca, conducting a major publicity campaign. They held mass meetings, circulated a general petition, and spoke to congressmen in Washington. The US Indian agent and ethnologist Henry Rowe Schoolcraft and other influential men became honorary members. In 1846 a general convention of the population of Genesee County, New York sent Morgan to Congress with a counter-offer. The Seneca were allowed to buy back some land at $20 per acre, at which time the Tonawanda Reservation was created. The previous treaty was thrown out. Returning home, Morgan was adopted into the Hawk Clan, Seneca Tribe, as the son of Jimmy Johnson on October 31, 1847, in part to honor his work with the Seneca on the reservation issues. They named him Tayadaowuhkuh, meaning "bridging the gap" (between the Iroquois and the European Americans).

After Morgan was admitted to the tribe, he lost interest in the New Confederacy. The group retained its secrecy and initiation requirements, but they were being hotly disputed. When internal dissent began to impede the group's efficacy in 1847, Morgan stopped attending. For practical purposes it ceased to exist, but Morgan and Parker continued with a series of "Iroquois Letters" to the American Whig Review, edited by George Colton. The Seneca case dragged on. Finally in 1857 the Supreme Court of the United States affirmed that only the federal government could evict the Seneca from their land. As it declined to do that, the case was over. The Ogden Land Company collapsed.

Marriage and family
In 1851 Morgan summarized his investigation of Iroquois customs in his first book of note, League of the Iroquois, one of the founding works of ethnology. In it he compares systems of kinship. In that year also he married his cross-cousin, Mary Elizabeth Steele, his companion and partner for the rest of his life. She had intended to become a Presbyterian missionary. On their wedding day he presented to her an ornate copy of his new book. It was dedicated to his collaborator, Ely Parker.

In 1853 Mary's father died, leaving her a large inheritance. The Morgans bought a brownstone in a wealthy suburb of Rochester. In that year they had a son, Lemuel, who "turned out to be mentally handicapped". Morgan's rising fame had brought him public attention, and Lemuel's condition (on no specific evidence) was universally attributed to the first-cousin marriage. The Morgans had to endure perpetual criticism, which they accepted as true, Lewis going so far as to take a stand against cousin marriage in his book Ancient Society. The Morgan marriage nevertheless remained a close and affectionate one. In 1856, Mary Elisabeth was born and in 1860 Helen King.

Morgan and his wife were active in the First Presbyterian Church of Rochester, although it was mainly of interest to Mary. Lewis refused to make "the public profession of Christ that was necessary for full membership". They both sponsored and contributed to charitable works.

Supporting education
For several years "his ethnical interests lay dormant", but not his scholarship and writing. In 1852 Morgan and eight other "Rochester intellectuals" instituted The Pundit Club, shortened later to just The Club, a scientific and literary society before which the members read papers they had researched for the occasion. Morgan read papers to The Club every year for the rest of his life. He also joined the American Association for the Advancement of Science.

Morgan and other leading men of Rochester decided to found a university, the University of Rochester. It did not support the matriculation of women. The group resolved to found a college for women, the Barleywood Female University, which was advertised but apparently never started. In the same year of its foundation, 1852, the donor of the land on which it was to be located gave it to the University of Rochester instead. Morgan was gravely disappointed. He believed that equality of the sexes is a mark of advanced civilization. For the present, he lacked the wealth and connections to prevent the collapse of Barleywood. Later he would serve as a founding trustee of the board of Wells College in Aurora. In addition, he and Mary would leave their estate to the University of Rochester for the foundation of a women's college.

Success at last
In 1855 Morgan and other Rochester businessmen invested in the expanding metals industry of the Upper Peninsula of Michigan. After a brief sojourn on the 5-man board of the Iron Mountain Railroad, Morgan joined them in creating the Bay de Noquet and Marquette Railroad Company, connecting the entire Upper Peninsula by a single, ore-bearing line. He became its attorney and director. At that time the U.S. government was selling lands previously confiscated from the natives in cases where the sale benefited the public good. Although the Upper Peninsula was known for its great natural beauty, the discovery of iron persuaded Morgan and others to develop wide-scale mining and industrialization of the peninsula. He spent the next few years between Washington, lobbying for the sale of the land to his company, and in large cities such as Detroit and Chicago, where he fought lawsuits to prevent competitors from taking it. Morgan vigorously defended American capitalism to protect his own interests. After the stockholders refused to pay him for some of his legal work, he all but withdrew from business in favor of field work in anthropology.

In 1861 in the middle of his field work, Morgan was elected as Member of the New York State Assembly on the Republican ticket. The Morgans traditionally had belonged to the Whigs, which dissolved in 1856; most Whigs joined the Republicans, created in 1854. Morgan did not run with any agenda except his own as it pertained to the Iroquois. He was seeking appointment by the President of the United States as Commissioner of the new Bureau of Indian Affairs (BIA). Morgan anticipated that William H. Seward would be elected president, and outlined to him plans to employ the natives in the manufacture and sale of Indian goods.

At the last moment Abraham Lincoln displaced Seward as the Republican candidate. The new president was deluged by letters from Morgan's associates asking that Morgan be appointed commissioner. Lincoln explained that the post had already been exchanged by his campaign manager for political support. With the chance for appointment lost, Morgan, who had made no pretense of interest in New York state's government, returned to field study of the natives.

Field anthropologist
After attending the 1856 meeting of the American Association for the Advancement of Science, Morgan decided on an ethnology study to compare kinship systems. He conducted a field research program funded by himself and the Smithsonian Institution, 1859–1862. He made four expeditions, two to the Plains tribes of Kansas and Nebraska, and two more up the Missouri River past Yellowstone. This was before the development of any inland transportation system. Passengers on riverboats could shoot Bison and other game for food along the upper Missouri River. He collected data on 51 kinship systems. Tribes included the Winnebago, Crow, Yankton, Kaw, Blackfeet, Omaha and others.

At the height of Morgan's anthropological field work, death struck his family. In May and June, 1862, their two daughters, ages 6 and 2, died as a result of scarlet fever while Morgan was traveling in the West. In Sioux City, Iowa, Morgan received the news from his wife. He wrote in his journal:

Two of three of my children are taken. Our family is destroyed. The intelligence has simply petrified me. I have not shed a tear. It is too profound for tears. Thus ends my last expedition. I go home to my stricken and mourning wife, a miserable and destroyed man.

The Civil War
During this time, neither Morgan nor Mary showed any interest in abolitionism, nor did they participate in the American Civil War. They differed markedly from their friend Ely Parker. The latter attempted to raise an Iroquois regiment but was denied, on the grounds that he was not a US citizen, and denied service on the same ground. He entered the army finally by the intervention of his friend, Ulysses S. Grant, serving on Grant's staff. Parker was present at the surrender of General Lee; to Lee's remark that Parker was the "true American" (as an American Indian), he responded, "We are all Americans here, sir."

Morgan held no consistent views on the war. He could easily have joined the anti-slavery cause if he had wished to do so. Rochester, as the last station before Canada on the Underground Railroad, was a center of abolitionism. Frederick Douglass published the North Star in Rochester. Like Morgan, Douglass supported the equality of women, yet they never made connection.

Morgan was anti-slavery but opposed abolitionism on the grounds that slavery was protected by law. Before the war he assented to the possible division of the nation on the grounds of "irreconcilable differences", that is, slavery, between regions. Morgan began to change his mind when some of his friends who had gone out to watch the First Battle of Bull Run were captured and imprisoned by the Confederates for the duration. By the end of the war, he was insisting along with most others that Jefferson Davis be hanged as a traitor. In 1866 he formed the Rochester Committee for the Relief of Southern Starvation.

Morgan did participate indirectly in the war through his company. Recovering from the deaths of his daughters and having resolved to end the expeditions that had taken him away from home, he gave his life totally over to business. In 1863 he and Samuel Ely formed a partnership creating the Morgan Iron Company in northern Michigan. The war had created such a high demand for metals that within the first year of business, the company paid off its founding debt and offered 100% dividends on its stock. The demand went on until 1868, enabling the company to construct a blast furnace. Morgan became independently wealthy and could retire from the practice of law.

The Erie Railroad affair
Morgan took up trout fishing during his Michigan period. He fished in the wilds of Michigan during the summers, sometimes with Ojibwe guides. During this recreational activity, he became interested in beavers, which had greatly modified the lowlands. After several summers of tracking and observing beavers in the field, in 1868 he published a work describing in detail the biology and habits of this animal, which shaped the environment through its construction of dams.

In that year also, his wealth secure and free of business, Morgan entered the state government again as a senator, 1868–1869, still seeking appointment as head of the Bureau of Indian Affairs. He was ridiculed by the Union Advertiser as being a "hobby candidate". The Republicans that year were running on a platform of moral probity. They argued that as a superior class, they could and should serve as guardians of the public morals. Morgan passed muster on the heredity because of his descent and Mary's descent from William Bradford, of Mayflower note. Morgan soon was immersed in such issues as whether beer drinking on Sunday should be allowed (a veiled hit at the new German immigrants).

As member of the Standing Committee on Railroads, Morgan became embroiled in a major issue of the day and one closer to his interests: monopoly. The New York Central Railroad, under Cornelius Vanderbilt, had attempted a hostile takeover of the Erie Railroad under Jay Gould by buying up its stock. The two railroads competed for the Rochester market. Daniel Drew, Erie's treasurer, defended successfully by creating new stock, which he had his friends sold short, dropping the value of the stock. Vanderbilt dumped the stock, barely covering the losses. Ordinarily such stock manipulations were illegal. The Railroad Act of 1850, however, allowed railroads to borrow money in exchange for bonds convertible to stocks. Given essentially free stocks, friends of the Erie Railroad grew rich; that is, Drew had found a way to transfer Vanderbilt's wealth to his own friends. Vanderbilt just escaped ruin. He immediately appealed to the state government.

The Railroad Committee investigated the affair. Gould purchased inaction among the senators, a practice Morgan had seen in the Ogden Land Company Affair. This time he worked to protect his friends from investigation. No action was taken. The Erie Railroad affair tapped Morgan's deepest ideological beliefs. To him the role of capitalism in creating mobile wealth was essential to the advancement of civilization. A monopoly such as Vanderbilt had been trying to build would choke off the downward flow of wealth. His report of the Railroad Committee attacked both Vanderbilt and Gould. It argued that the system in its "tendency to combination" was broken. He asserted that the people had to use government action to rein in the power of large corporations. For the time being the Erie Railroad was supported, but Morgan noted that its victory was just as dangerous to society as its defeat would have been.

The Grant-Parker policy on Native Americans
Despite his new interest in government, which was to come to be expressed in his subsequent works on social systems, Morgan persisted in his major goal in running for office, to be appointed Commissioner of Indian Affairs. The choice was now up to President Grant. Together in The League, Parker and Morgan had determined the policy Grant was to adopt. They thought that, much as Parker had assimilated, American Indians should assimilate into American society; they were not yet considered US citizens. Of the two men responsible for his policy, Grant chose his former adjutant. Terribly disappointed, Morgan never applied for the post again. The two collaborators did not speak to each other during Parker's tenure, but Morgan stayed on intimate terms with Parker's family.

The implementation of assimilation policy was more difficult than either man had anticipated. Parker controlled none of the variables. The American Indians were to be moved into reservations, assisted with supplies and food so they could start subsistence farming, and educated at mission schools to be converted to Christianity and American values, until they adopted European-American ways. In theory they would then be able to enter American society at large. The system of appointed Indian agents and traders had long been corrupt; in addition, unscrupulous land agents took the best land and moved American Indians into the desert lands, which did not support small-scale household farms and did not have sufficient game for hunting. Thieves among the agents replaced food and goods intended for the Indians with inedible or no foodstuffs. Faced with these realities, the American Indians refused the reservations or abandoned them, and attempted to return to ancestral lands, now occupied by white settlers. In other cases, they raided white settlements for food or attacked them seeking to repel the invaders. Grant resorted to military solutions and used U.S. soldiers to repress the tribes. This warfare exacerbated the failure of the army to protect the American Indians against depredations and encroachment by white settlers.

In 1871 Congress took action to halt the suppression of the Natives. It created a Board of Indian Commissioners and relieved Parker of his main responsibilities. Parker resigned in protest. After suffering years of poverty and attempt to suppress their cultures, American Indians were admitted to citizenship in 1924. The government continued to send their children to Indian boarding schools, started in the late 1870s, where Indian languages and cultures were prohibited. Policies of diversity and limited sovereignty were adopted. The Grant administration is universally regarded as inept in Indian affairs as well as have been rife with corruption. Although Morgan contributed to the ideology of assimilation, he escaped accountability for the results.

Later career
Having failed to become Commissioner of Indian Affairs, Morgan applied for various ambassadorships under the Grant administration, including to China and Peru. Grant's administration rejected all the applications, after which Morgan resolved to visit Europe on his own with a professional as well as a personal agenda.

For one year, 1870–71, the three Morgans went on a grand tour of Europe. During his European travels, Morgan met Charles Darwin and the great British anthropologists of the age. He visited Sir John Lubbock, who had coined the words "Paleolithic" and "Neolithic", and used the terms "barbarians" and "savages" in his own studies of the three-age system. Morgan adopted these terms, but with an altered sense, in Ancient Society. Lubbock was using modern ethnology as he knew it to reconstruct the ways of human ancestors. Lubbock's main works had already been published by the time of Morgan's visit. Morgan recorded his European travel and contacts in a journal of several volumes. Extracts were published in 1937 by Leslie White.

He continued with his independent scholarship, never becoming affiliated with any university, although he associated with university presidents and the leading ethnologists looked up to him as a founder of the field. He was an intellectual mentor to those who followed, including John Wesley Powell, who became head of the Bureau of Ethnology in 1879 at the Smithsonian Institution. Morgan was consulted by the highest levels of government on appointments and other ethnological matters. In 1878 he conducted one final field trip, leading a small party in search of native ruins in the American Southwest. They were the first to describe the Aztec ruins on the Animas River but missed discovering Mesa Verde.

Death and legacy
In 1879 Morgan completed two construction projects. One was his library, an addition to the house he had purchased with Mary many years before and where he died in December 1881. He combined the opening of the library with a celebration of the 25th anniversary of The Club. It included a dinner for 40 persons, who were by that time the leading lights of Rochester. The library acquired some fame as a local monument. Pictures were taken and published. The Club only met there one other time, however, at Morgan's funeral in 1881. The second building project was a mausoleum for his daughters in Mount Hope Cemetery. It became the resting place of the entire remainder of the family, starting with Lewis.

His wife survived him by two years. They both left wills. A nephew of Lewis moved to Rochester with his family and took up residence in the house to care for Lewis' and Mary's son. On the son's death 20 years later, the entire estate reverted to the University of Rochester, which by the terms of the wills was to use the funds for the endowment of a college for women, dedicated as a memorial to the Morgan daughters. The nephew attempted to break the wills on his behalf but lost the case in the state supreme court. The house with the library survived into mid-20th-century, when it was demolished to make way for a highway bypass system. Materials relating to Morgan's writings are held in a special collection at the University of Rochester library.

Professional associations
Morgan was elected a member of the American Antiquarian Society in 1865. He was elected president of the American Association for the Advancement of Science in 1879. Morgan was also a member of the National Academy of Sciences.

Thought

Work in ethnology
In the 1840s, Morgan had befriended the young Ely S. Parker of the Seneca tribe and the Tonawanda Reservation. With a classical missionary education, Parker went on to study law. With his help, Morgan studied the culture and the structure of Iroquois society. Morgan had noticed they used different terms than Europeans to designate individuals by their relationships within the extended family. He had the creative insight to recognize this was meaningful in terms of their social organization. He defined European terms as "descriptive" and Iroquois (and Native American) terms as "classificatory", terms that continue to be used as major divisions by anthropologists and ethnographers.

Based on his research enabled by Parker, Morgan and Parker wrote and published The League of the Ho-dé-no-sau-nee or Iroquois (1851). Morgan dedicated the book to Parker (who was then 23) and "our joint researches". In subsequent publications of the book Parker's name was omitted. This work presented the complexity of Iroquois society in a path-breaking ethnography that was a model for future anthropologists, as Morgan presented the kinship system of the Iroquois with unprecedented nuance.

Morgan expanded his research far beyond the Iroquois. Although Benjamin Barton had posited Asian origins for Native Americans as early as 1797, in the mid-nineteenth century, other American and European scholars still supported widely varying ideas, including a theory they were one of the lost tribes of Israel, because of the strong influence of biblical and classical conceptions of history. Morgan had begun to theorize the Native Americans originated in Asia. He thought he could prove it by a broad study of kinship terms used by people in Asia as well as tribes in North America.

He wanted to provide evidence for monogenesis, the theory that all human beings descend from a common source (as opposed to polygenism).

In the late 1850s and 1860s, Morgan collected kinship data from a variety of Native American tribes. In his quest to do comparative kinship studies, Morgan also corresponded with scholars, missionaries, US Indian agents, colonial agents, and military officers around the world. He created a questionnaire which others could complete so he could collect data in a standardized way. Over several years, he made months-long trips to what was then the Wild West to further his research.

With the help of local contacts and, after intensive correspondence over the course of years, Morgan analyzed his data and wrote his seminal Systems of Consanguinity and Affinity of the Human Family (1871), which was printed by the Smithsonian Press. It "created at a stroke what without exaggeration might be called the seminal concern of contemporary anthropology, the study of kinship ..." In this work, Morgan set forth his argument for the unity of humankind. At the same time, he presented a sophisticated schema of social evolution based upon the relationship terms, the categories of kinship, used by peoples around the world. Through his analysis of kinship terms, Morgan discerned that the structure of the family and social institutions develop and change according to a specific sequence.

Theory of social evolution
This original theory became less relevant because of the Darwinian revolution, which demonstrated how change happens over time. In addition, Morgan became increasingly interested in the comparative study of kinship (family) relations as a window into understanding larger social dynamics. He saw kinship relations as a basic part of society. Morgan viewed society as a living system that changes over time.

In the years that followed, Morgan developed his theories. Combined with an exhaustive study of classic Greek and Roman sources, he crowned his work with his magnum opus Ancient Society (1877). Morgan elaborated upon his theory of social evolution. He introduced a critical link between social progress and technological progress. He emphasized the centrality of family and property relations. He traced the interplay between the evolution of technology, of family relations, of property relations, of the larger social structures and systems of governance, and intellectual development.

Looking across an expanded span of human existence, Morgan presented three major stages: savagery, barbarism, and civilization. He divided and defined the stages by technological inventions, such as use of fire, bow, pottery in the savage era; domestication of animals, agriculture, and metalworking in the barbarian era; and development of the alphabet and writing in the civilization era. In part, this was an effort to create a structure for North American history that was comparable to the three-age system of European pre-history, which had been developed as an evidence-based system by the Danish antiquarian Christian Jürgensen Thomsen in the 1830s; his work  (Guideline to Scandinavian Antiquity) was published in English in 1848. The concept of evidence-based chronological dating received wider notice in English-speaking nations as developed by J. J. A. Worsaae, whose The Primeval Antiquities of Denmark was published in English in 1849.

Initially Morgan's work was accepted as integral to American history, but later it was treated as a separate category of anthropology. Henry Adams wrote of Ancient Society that it "must become the foundation of all future work in American historical science." The historian Francis Parkman also was a fan, but later nineteenth-century historians pushed Native American history to the side of the American story.

Morgan's final work, Houses and House-life of the American Aborigines (1881), was an elaboration on what he had originally planned as an additional part of Ancient Society. In it, Morgan presented evidence, mostly from North and South America, that the development of house architecture and house culture reflected the development of kinship and property relations.

Although many specific aspects of Morgan's evolutionary position have been rejected by later anthropologists, his real achievements remain impressive. He founded the sub-discipline of kinship studies. Anthropologists remain interested in the connections which Morgan outlined between material culture and social structure. His impact has been felt far beyond the Ivory Tower.

Morgan was not quite the social reformer some would believe him to be. Outraged at the manipulations of the Ogden Land Company to get possession of the Tonawanda Seneca Reservation, Morgan exerted some effort in behalf of the Indians, but not nearly as much or to such effect as is generally supposed. Most of his effort seems to have been limited to a few months in 1846, and the issue was not settled until 1857, more than ten years later. The Indians' principal legal counsel in these years was not Morgan, but John Martindale. Morgan's role, such as it was, was that of citizen activist. Then, too, although a champion of the Indian, Morgan was not an advocate of cultural pluralism nor did he work for "cultural survival." The Indian, Morgan exhorted his fellow citizens, ought to be rescued "from his impending destiny," "reclaimed and civilized, and thus saved eventually from the fate which has already befallen so many of our aboriginal races" by education and Christianity.

Influence on Marxism
In 1881, Karl Marx started reading Morgan's Ancient Society, thus beginning Morgan's posthumous influence among European thinkers. Friedrich Engels also read his work after Morgan's death. Although Marx never finished his own book based on Morgan's work, Engels continued his analysis. Morgan's work on the social structure and material culture strongly influenced Engels' sociological theory of dialectical materialism (expressed in his work The Origin of the Family, Private Property, and the State, 1884). Scholars of the Communist bloc considered Morgan as the preeminent anthropologist. Morgan's work has led to some believing that early communist-like societies existed in Native American society. Though the belief of primitive communism as based on Morgan's work is flawed due to Morgan's misunderstandings of Haudenosaunee society and his, since proven wrong, theory of social evolution. This, and subsequent more accurate research, has led to the society of the Haudenosaunee to be of interest in communist and anarchist analysis. Particularly aspects where land was not treated as a commodity, communal ownership and near non-existent rates of crime.

Eponymous honors
 Annual lecture in Morgan's name at the Anthropology Department of the University of Rochester.
 Rochester Public School #37 in the 19th Ward named "Lewis H. Morgan #37 School"
 Lewis Henry Morgan Institute (a research organization), SUNYIT, Utica, New York
 Lewis H. Morgan Rochester Regional Chapter of the New York State Archeological Association

List of Morgan's writings
Lewis Morgan wrote continuously, whether letters, papers to be read, or published articles and books. A list of his major works follows. Some of the letters and papers have been omitted. A complete list, as far as was known, is given by Lloyd in the 1922 revised edition (posthumous) of The League ... . Specifically omitted are 14 "Letters on the Iroquois" read before the New Confederacy, 1844–1846, and published in The American Review in 1847 under another pen name, Skenandoah; 31 papers read before The Club, 1854–1880; and various book reviews published in The Nation.

See also
 Cultural evolution
 Sociocultural evolution
 Ethnology
 Unilineal evolution
 Origins of society
 List of important publications in anthropology

References

Bibliography

 
 .
 .
 
 
 
 Stern, Bernhard J. "Lewis Henry Morgan Today; An Appraisal of His Scientific Contributions," Science & Society, vol. 10, no. 2 (Spring 1946), pp. 172–176. In JSTOR.

External links

 
 
 
 1963 reissue of Ancient Society with introductions by Eleanor Leacock
 
 
 
 Knight, C. 2008. Early Human Kinship was Matrilineal.  In N. J. Allen, H. Callan, R. Dunbar and W. James (eds), Early Human Kinship. London: Royal Anthropological Institute, pp. 61–82.
 
 

1818 births
1881 deaths
People from Aurora, Cayuga County, New York
American people of Welsh descent
Republican Party members of the New York State Assembly
New York (state) state senators
American anthropologists
American feminists
Economic anthropologists
Native Americans' rights activists
19th-century American politicians
Union College (New York) alumni
Members of the American Antiquarian Society
Burials at Mount Hope Cemetery (Rochester)